USS Eastern Queen (ID-3406) was a United States Navy cargo ship in commission from 1918 to 1919.

Construction, acquisition, and commissioning
Eastern Queen was built as the commercial cargo ship SS Tofuku Maru and completed in February 1918 by the Kawasaki Dockyard Company at Kobe, Japan. She soon was delivered to the United States Shipping Board, which renamed her SS Eastern Queen.  On 22 July 1918, the U.S. Navys 13th Naval District inspected her for possible naval service during World War I. After she was converted by the Baltimore Drydock and Shipbuilding Company at Baltimore, Maryland, into an animal transport for naval use, the Shipping Board transferred her to the Navy on 19 October 1918. The Navy assigned her the naval registry identification number 3406 and commissioned her on 26 October 1918 as USS Eastern Queen (ID-3406).

Operational history
Eastern Queen departed Norfolk, Virginia, on 25 November 1918 - two weeks after 11 November 1918 Armistice with Germany had brought World War I to an end - carrying 550 horses plus other cargo. She arrived at St. Nazaire, France, on 14 December 1918 and discharged her cargo. She embarked 30 United States Army passengers and, ballasted with steel, got underway from St. Nazaire on 29 December 1918 on a voyage to Baltimore, which she reached on 15 January 1919.

Eastern Queen began a second transatlantic crossing on 2 February 1919 with a U.S. Army cargo of food, motor oil, and other cargo.  She called at La Pallice and Bordeaux, France, before returning to the United States on 10 April 1919.

Decommissioning and disposal
Eastern Queen was decommissioned on 19 April 1919. The Navy transferred her back to the U.S. Shipping Board the same day.

References

Department of the Navy: Naval Historical Center Online Library of Selected Images: Civilian Ships: S.S. Eastern Queen (Japanese-American Freighter, 1918). Originally named Tofuku Maru. Was USS Eastern Queen (ID # 3406) in 1918-1919
NavSource Online: Section Patrol Craft Photo Archive: Eastern Queen (ID 3406)

 

Auxiliary ships of the United States Navy
World War I cargo ships of the United States
Ships built by Kawasaki Heavy Industries
1918 ships